Nesodexia corsicana is a species of cluster fly in the family Polleniidae.

Distribution
France.

References

Polleniidae
Insects described in 1911
Diptera of Europe